This is a list of notable synagogues in the United States.

By state

Alabama
Agudath Israel Etz Ahayem, Montgomery
Temple Beth-El, Birmingham
Temple Beth-El, Anniston
Beth Israel Congregation, Gadsden
Knesseth Israel Congregation (Birmingham, Alabama)
Temple Beth Or, Montgomery
B'nai Jeshurun, Demopolis
Temple B'nai Sholom, Huntsville
Temple Emanu-El, Birmingham
Knesseth Israel, Mountain Brook (suburb of Birmingham)
Sha’arai Shomayim Congregation, Mobile

Alaska

Congregation Or HaTzafon, Fairbanks
Congregation Beth Shalom, Anchorage
Alaska Jewish Campus, Anchorage
The David & Ruth Green Lubavitch Jewish Center of Alaska, Anchorage

Arizona
Congregation Beth Israel (Scottsdale, Arizona)
Jewish History Museum (Tucson), is the oldest synagogue in the state
Temple Emanu-El (Tucson)
Temple Emanuel of Tempe
Temple Beth Israel (Phoenix)

Arkansas
Temple Shalom of Northwest Arkansas, Fayetteville
Temple Meir Chayim, McGehee

California

Congregation Beth Israel (Berkeley, California)
Temple Beth Israel (Fresno, California)
Aish HaTorah 
Beth Chayim Chadashim
Breed Street Shul
Sephardic Temple Tifereth Israel
Sinai Temple (Los Angeles, California)
Temple Beth Israel of Highland Park and Eagle Rock
Temple Israel of Hollywood
Stephen Wise Temple
Valley Beth Shalom Synagogue
Wilshire Boulevard Temple
Yeshiva Aharon Yaakov-Ohr Eliyahu
Yeshiva University High Schools of Los Angeles
Temple Sinai (Oakland, California)
Pasadena Jewish Temple and Center
Congregation B'nai Israel (Sacramento, California)
Congregation Beth Israel (San Diego)
San Diego Jewish Academy
Congregation Beth Israel-Judea
Beyt Tikkun Synagogue
Bush Street Temple
Congregation Emanu-El (San Francisco, California)
Congregation Sherith Israel (San Francisco, California)
Temple Israel (Stockton, California)
Congregation Ner Tamid, Rancho Palos Verdes
Congregation B'nai Israel (Daly City, California)
Congregation Beth Am (Los Altos Hills, California)
Rodef Sholom (San Rafael, California)
Peninsula Temple Beth El (San Mateo, California)

Colorado
 Beth HaMedrosh Hagodol-Beth Joseph, Denver
 Temple Emanuel, Denver
 Temple Sinai (Denver, Colorado)
 Temple Aaron, Trinidad (1888 building)
 Congregation Ohr Shalom (Grand Junction, Colorado)

Connecticut
 Achavath Achim Synagogue
 Agudath Sholem Synagogue
 Ahavas Sholem Synagogue
 Anshei Israel Synagogue
 Congregation B'nai Israel (Bridgeport, Connecticut)
 Temple Beth Israel (Hartford, Connecticut)
 Congregation Beth Israel (West Hartford, Connecticut)
 Beth Israel Synagogue (New Haven, Connecticut)
 Beth Israel Synagogue (Norwalk, Connecticut)
 Beth Shalom Rodfe Zedek
 Congregation B'nai Jacob (Woodbridge, Connecticut)
 Congregation Knesseth Israel (Ellington, Connecticut)
 Congregation Mishkan Israel
 Ohev Sholem Synagogue
 Tephereth Israel Synagogue
 TCS (The Conservative Synagogue) of Westport, CT

Delaware

District of Columbia
Adas Israel Congregation, founded in 1869
Bet Mishpachah, DC's LGBTQ synagogue, founded in 1975
DC Minyan, founded in 2002
Hill Havurah, Capitol Hill synagogue, founded in 2000
Kesher Israel Congregation, the Georgetown Synagogue, founded in 1911
Machar, The Washington Congregation for Secular Humanistic Judaism, Washington D.C.
Ohev Sholom - The National Synagogue, formerly Ohev Sholom Talmud Torah, formed in 1958 as a merger between Ohev Sholom Congregation, founded as Chai Adon Congregation in 1886, and Talmud Torah Congregation, founded in 1889
Sixth & I Historic Synagogue, rededicated in 2004, housed in the building that served Adas Israel Congregation between 1908 and 1951
Washington Hebrew Congregation, founded in 1852

Florida
 Ahavath Chesed competes with Temple Beth-El in Pensacola for the honor of being each the oldest Jewish congregation in Florida. The Jacksonville congregation was meeting for prayer by 1867, but appears to have incorporated later than Pensacola which dedicated its first building in 1876, well before Jacksonville's 1882 building.
 Bet Shira Congregation
 Temple Beth-El (Pensacola, Florida). See above under Jacksonville's Ahavath Chesed synagogue.
 United Hebrews of Ocala. Their building, built in 1888, may be the oldest Florida synagogue building still standing.
 Jewish Discovery Center of Brandon. A Chabad synagogue.

Georgia
 Congregation B'nai Torah of Sandy Springs, Georgia held its first services in 1981
 Congregation Mickve Israel of Savannah, Georgia was organized in 1733.

Hawaii 
Aloha Jewish Chapel, Pearl Harbor
Temple Emanu-El, Honolulu

Idaho 
 Ahavath Beth Israel, Boise, Idaho (1896). The synagogue was built for Beth Israel (founded 1895). In the 1980s, the congregation was formed as a merger of Congregation Beth Israel and Ahavath Israel (founded 1912).

Illinois
 B'nai Jehoshua Beth Elohim (BJBE) One of the oldest and most influential congregations in the area, originally founded by Bohemian immigrants in 1893. 
 KAM Isaiah Israel merged several older congregations in Chicago, the oldest of which - Kehillat Anshe Maarav - was founded in 1847.
 Loop Synagogue
 Adas Yeshurun
 Khal Chessed L'Avraham Zidichov-The Chicago Center 
 Agudas Yisroel Warsaw Bikur Cholim
 Mekor Hachaim
 Chicago Chassidishe Kollel
 Bais Chaim Dovid
 Adas Bnei Yisroel
 Congregation Bnei Ruven
 Khal Ohr Yisocher Chodorov
 Congregation Beth Itzchok

Indiana
Ahavas Shalom Reform Temple
Congregation Achduth Vesholom of Fort Wayne was formed in 1848
Indianapolis Hebrew Congregation

Iowa
B'nai Israel Synagogue (Council Bluffs, Iowa)
B'nai Jacob Synagogue (Ottumwa, Iowa)
Mount Sinai Temple (Sioux City, Iowa)
Temple Emanuel of Davenport was formed as B’Nai Israel Congregation on October 21, 1861.  It is Iowa's oldest Jewish congregation still in existence.
Temple Judah (Cedar Rapids, Iowa)

Kansas

Kentucky
Congregation Agudath Achim (Ashland, Kentucky))

Louisiana
Touro Synagogue (New Orleans)

Maine
 Etz Chaim Synagogue, Portland, Maine
 Shaarey Tphiloh, Portland, Maine

Maryland
B'er Chayim Temple, Cumberland, Maryland
Ohev Sholom Talmud Torah Congregation of Olney, Olney, Maryland
Magen David Sephardic Congregation, Rockville, Maryland
Beth Am, Reservoir Hill, Baltimore City, Maryland
B'nai Israel, Rockville, Maryland
Young Israel Shomrai Emunah, Kemp Mill, Maryland

Massachusetts
Adams Street Shul, Newton, Massachusetts
Ahavath Torah (Stoughton, Massachusetts)
Beth Israel Synagogue (Cambridge, Massachusetts) 
Congregation Beth Israel (Worcester, Massachusetts)
Shaarai Torah Synagogue (Worcester, Massachusetts)
Temple Emanuel Sinai (Worcester, Massachusetts)
Temple Israel (Boston, Massachusetts)
The Vilna Shul, Boston, Massachusetts
 Congregation Or Atid, Wayland, Massachusetts

Michigan
Temple Emanuel, Grand Rapids, oldest extant synagogue building (1882), congregation founded in 1857 (fifth oldest in the U.S.)
Temple Israel, West Bloomfield
Temple Beth El, Bloomfield Township

Minnesota

Mississippi
Temple Adath Israel (Cleveland, Mississippi)
Congregation Beth Israel (Meridian, Mississippi)
Beth Israel Congregation (Jackson, Mississippi)
Gemiluth Chessed (Port Gibson, Mississippi)
Temple B'nai Shalom (Brookhaven, Mississippi)
Temple B'nai Israel (Tupelo, Mississippi)

Missouri
United Hebrew Congregation, 1837, is the oldest congregation in Missouri and west of the Mississippi River.
Congregation Shaare Emeth (Creve Coeur, Missouri), 1869.
Congregation B'nai Amoona (Creve Coeur, Missouri), 1882.
Temple Beth El, Jefferson City, MO, Continuous operation of the same location and building since 1883.
Congregation Temple Israel (Creve Coeur, Missouri), 1886.
B'Nai Israel Synagogue (Cape Girardeau, Missouri), 1937.

Montana
Temple Emanu-El (Helena, Montana), built 1891, first and oldest synagogue in Montana, building now converted to other uses.

Nebraska

Nevada

New Hampshire

New Jersey

Adas Emuno Congregation, Leonia, New Jersey
Congregation Ahavath Torah, Englewood, New Jersey
Congregation B'nai Israel, Millburn, NJ
Prince Street Synagogue, Newark, New Jersey, built 1884, former home of Oheb Shalom Congregation, now used by an urban environmental center.
Temple Beth-El, Jersey City, NJ

New Mexico
Congregation Albert, founded in 1897, is the oldest continuing Jewish organization in New Mexico.

New York
Agudas Achim Synagogue, Livingston Manor, NY
Anshei Glen Wild Synagogue, Sullivan County, NY
B'nai Israel Synagogue (Woodbourne, New York)
B'nai Jeshurun (Manhattan, New York)
Beth Joseph Synagogue, Tupper Lake, NY
Chevro Ahavath Zion Synagogue, Monticello, NY
Congregation B'nai Israel Synagogue, Fleischmanns, NY
Congregation Emanu-El of New York, Manhattan, NY
Congregation Kehilath Jeshurun, Manhattan, NY
Central Synagogue, Manhattan, NY
Congregation Shaare Zedek (New York City)
Congregation Shaare Zion, Brooklyn, NY
Congregation Tifereth Israel Synagogue, Greenport, NY
Fifth Avenue Synagogue, Manhattan, NY
Jericho Jewish Center, Jericho, New York
Kane Street Synagogue (Congregation Baith Israel Anshei Emes), Brooklyn, NY
North Country Reform Temple, Glen Cove, NY
Park Avenue Synagogue, Manhattan, NY
Park East Synagogue, Manhattan, NY
Temple Beth-El, Hornell, New York (inactive)
Temple Beth Zion, Buffalo, NY
Temple Shaaray Tefila, Manhattan, NY
Temple Society of Concord, Syracuse, NY
Yeshiva Kesser Torah, Queens, NY

North Carolina
Congregation Beth Israel (Asheville, North Carolina)
Congregation Emanuel (Statesville, North Carolina)
Congregation Oheb Sholom (Goldsboro, North Carolina)
Temple Israel (Charlotte, North Carolina)
Temple Israel (Kinston, North Carolina)
Temple of Israel (Wilmington, North Carolina)

North Dakota
B'nai Israel Synagogue and Montefiore Cemetery, Grand Forks, North Dakota

Ohio
 Anshe Chesed Fairmount Temple (Beachwood)
 Oheb Zedek-Cedar Sinai Synagogue (Lyndhurst)
 Park Synagogue (Cleveland Heights)
 The Rockdale Temple (1824), originally known as K.K. Bene Israel in Cincinnati, is the oldest congregation west of the Allegheny Mountains and the second oldest Ashkenazi congregation in the United States.
 Sherith Israel Temple, also in Cincinnati (1860) is the oldest synagogue structure west of the Alleghenies.
 Temple Tifereth-Israel (Beachwood)
 B’nai Jeshurun (Pepper Pike)

Oklahoma

Oregon
 Temple Beth Israel, Eugene, Oregon
 Congregation Beth Israel, Portland, Oregon
 Neveh Shalom Synagogue, Portland, Oregon

Pennsylvania
 Congregation Mikveh Israel, congregation founded in 1740s in Philadelphia
 Congregation Kehillas B'nai Shalom (Bucks County)
 Congregation Rodeph Shalom, on the NRHP
 Beth Shalom Congregation, Synagogue building designed by Frank Lloyd Wright
 Kesher Israel Congregation, Harrisburg, Pennsylvania
 Kesher Zion, Reading, Pennsylvania
 Congregation Shivtei Yeshuron-Ezras Israel, Oldest active South Philadelphia rowhouse shul
 Temple Sinai, Dresher, Pennsylvania
 Tree of Life – Or L'Simcha Congregation, Pittsburgh, Pennsylvania

Rhode Island
 Sons of Jacob Synagogue (Providence, Rhode Island)
 Temple Beth-El (Providence, Rhode Island)
 Touro Synagogue (Newport, Rhode Island) is the oldest surviving synagogue in North America.

South Carolina
 Congregation Kahal Kadosh Beth Elohim, Charleston, South Carolina
 Temple Beth Elohim (Georgetown, South Carolina)
 Beth Israel Congregation (Beaufort, South Carolina)
 Beth Israel Congregation (Florence, South Carolina)
 House of Peace Synagogue, Columbia, South Carolina
 Temple Sinai (Sumter, South Carolina)

Tennessee
 Temple Adas Israel (Brownsville, Tennessee)
 Baron Hirsch Synagogue, Memphis, Tennessee
 Temple Israel (Memphis, Tennessee)
 Mizpah Congregation, Chattanooga, Tennessee
 Congregation Ohabai Sholom (Nashville, Tennessee)
 Congregation Sherith Israel (Nashville, Tennessee)
 Temple B'Nai Israel, Jackson, Tennessee

Texas
B'nai Abraham Synagogue (Brenham, Texas), founded in 1885.
The 1870 building of Congregation B'nai Israel (Galveston, Texas), is the oldest synagogue building.
Temple Beth Israel (Houston, Texas), founded in 1854, is the oldest congregation in the state.
Congregation Beth Yeshurun (Houston, Texas) is one of the largest Conservative synagogues in the world.
Temple Sinai (Houston, Texas), was the first Reform Synagogue to be established in West Houston.

Utah
B'nai Israel Temple (Salt Lake City, Utah)
Congregation Kol Ami (Salt Lake City, Utah)
Congregation Sharey Tzedek Synagogue

Vermont
Ohavi Zedek (Burlington)
Rutland Jewish Center

Virginia
 Agudas Achim Congregation (Alexandria, Virginia)

Washington

 Congregation Beth Israel (Bellingham, Washington)
 Bikur Cholim Machzikay Hadath
 Temple De Hirsch Sinai
 Congregation Ezra Bessaroth
 Langston Hughes Performing Arts Center
 Ohaveth Sholum Congregation
 Sephardic Bikur Holim Congregation

West Virginia
Temple Shalom (Wheeling, West Virginia)

Wisconsin

Wyoming

By territory

American Samoa

Guam

Northern Mariana Islands

Puerto Rico
Temple Beth Shalom, San Juan, PR

U.S. Virgin Islands
St. Thomas Synagogue, St. Thomas, VI

See also
List of synagogues named Temple Israel
List of the oldest synagogues in the United States
List of Young Israel Synagogues

References

 
Synagogues